Arthur Samuel Ling (14 March 1881 – February 1943) was an English professional footballer, best remembered for his time as a goalkeeper in the Southern League with Swindon Town and Brentford. He also played in the Football League for Leicester Fosse and professional cricket for Cambridgeshire.

Career statistics

References

1881 births
1943 deaths
English footballers
People from Grantchester
Association football goalkeepers
Leicester City F.C. players
Swindon Town F.C. players
Brentford F.C. players
English Football League players
Southern Football League players
Cambridgeshire cricketers
English cricketers of 1890 to 1918